Women in South Korea have experienced significant improvements for social changes in recent years, compared to previous times,  when Confucianism was deeply imbued in the culture. In today's society, the economy of South Korea has tremendously improved due to urbanisation, industrialisation, military authoritarianism, democratic reform, and social liberalisation since the late 1960s. Thus, gender roles and gender identities eventually have been modified as a result to changing modernity. More than half(in 2018 OECD economy survey, it was 56.1%. It is lower than OECD average.) of Korean women are employed and furthermore, more than 25% of married women are employed as full-time workers. In politics, although there are not as many female politicians as male politicians, the female politicians have recently begun to participate more actively than in the past. For instance, in the National Assembly, women occupy 20 of the 299 seats, less than 10%. In 2020 parliamentary election, women occupy 57 seats in the National Assembly. It is the largest number of seats ever.

The status of women varies depending on their social class and financial independence. In metropolitan areas, women have more access to education, which means they are less confined to the home as housewives. Most of the employed women in urban areas work in tertiary industries such as the service sector. Therefore, as working-class women, they have more power in making decisions within their households and are more financially independent. On the other hand, in rural areas, most women work in a primary industry such as the agriculture sector. In fact, they do not have the variety of educational and employment opportunities. According to a 2019 survey by Ministry of Agriculture, woman farmers accounted for more than 50% of all farmers. However, 81% responded that a woman farmer is lower in status than a male farmer.

The status of women has elevated to the point where it could be seen as equal to men's social standing in terms of education, health, and legal rights. However, there are still substantial political and economical prejudices against women. Moreover, Korean women still consistently face gender stereotypes regarding rigid gender roles. These stereotypes include women staying at home as housewives, being subordinate to men, having less power and voice in political and economic participation and movements, and more.

History 
In traditional Korean society, women were taught to be subordinated without formal advanced education or little education. Their roles were limited to be confined to the home as housewives and good mothers. Their duties were to maintain harmony in the household by avoiding any unnecessary conflicts. In addition, a married couple was to live in her husband's household by taking care of her husband's whole family including parents-in-law. Women were expected to produce sons and they were blamed if their children were girls due to the notion that a son was preferable to a daughter. This idea is called "son preference" (ko: 남아선호사상) and it resulted in sex selection and sex-selective abortion. The idea of a preference for a boy had a profound impact on family life in Korea's traditional society. Due to the importance of having a son, the status of a woman was greatly affected by her ability to have sons and the number of sons that she had. Failure to give birth to a son caused women to be treated disrespectfully. In addition, the taking of a concubine by a husband was justified when a wife continued to fail to give birth to a son.

Women did not have a voice nor were they able to participate in society as men did; instead they were expected to support their husbands.

An improvement in the status of women first appeared during the late 19th and early 20th centuries. A large number of Western Christian missionaries came to South Korea in order to set up modern schools. Some of these were established in order to educate women in diverse areas including literature, arts and religion. Prior to this, most Korean women did not have any access to education. As a result of this education, Korean women became able to participate in political movements because those who received education also took part in teaching other women.
The Korean women's movement started in the 1890s with the foundation of Chanyang-hoe, followed by a number of other groups, primarily focused on women's education and the abolition of gender segregation and other didscriminatory practices.

When Korea was under the colonial administration of Imperial Japan, many Korean women (numbering up to 200,000) were forced to work as comfort women in Japan's military brothels. Until the end of World War II, Korea was under Japanese occupation. Women participated in the independence movement against Japanese occupation during the 1910-45 period of Japanese colonisation. When Korea became a Japanese colony in 1910 women's associations were banned by the Japanese and many women instead engaged in the underground  resistance groups such as the Yosong Aeguk Tongji-hoe (Patriotic Women's Society) and the Taehan Aeguk Buin-hoe (Korean Patriotic Women's Society).  As a result, the role of women in society began to change.

After becoming independent from Japan, the Republic of Korea was established as a liberal democracy. Women were granted the constitutional right to equal opportunities and could pursue education, work, and public life. A number of schools were founded for the education of women. Women educated in these schools began to take part in the arts, teaching and other economic activities. They also engaged other women in the discussion of gender equality. The percentage of women in professional fields has steadily increased which has resulted in significant contributions to society, especially in terms of increasing GDP. As they took a larger role in economic activities, the educational level of women also increased, providing additional opportunities for professionalization. Today, Korean women receive high levels of education and actively participate in a wide variety of fields, including education, medicine, engineering, scholarship, the arts, law, literature, and sports.
In 1973, the women's groups in South Korea united in the Pan-Women's Society for the Revision of the Family Law to revise the discriminating Family Law of 1957, a cause that remained a main focus for the rest of the 20th-century, and finnally resulted in a major reform of the Family Law in 1991.

Women's participation in social and economic culture was expected to continue to grow and diversify after the election of South Korea's first female president, Park Geun-Hye in 2013. This was partially due to Park Geun-Hye's promise to promote a "women’s revolution" and provide support for childcare, increased opportunities for promotion, and salary equality. Furthermore, Park Geun-Hye also promised to make other advances for women, including: increasing the representation of women, facilitating women's employment and providing support for female workers, increasing educational opportunities for women to be competitive in the labor market, providing social welfare policies for women and promoting women's involvement in various social activities. However, not all of these policies were realised.

Legal Rights 

The Convention on the Elimination of Discrimination against Women (CEDAW) states that discrimination against women is about equality of rights and human dignity. The political and social principles of the state violate the principle of respect for sex and are equal to that of men. Pointing out that it is an obstacle to participation in the economic, cultural life of the country. For the sake of development and human welfare and peace, women are equal to men in all areas. It is necessary to participate as much as possible and achieve full equality between men and women. The traditional role of men as well as the role of women in society and home to be successful. Also, the issue of discrimination against women in society as a whole. In all fields, such as politics, economy, society, culture, etc., under the basic recognition that it is necessary to take responsibility for it. To ensure that all appropriate measures are taken by the Parties to eliminate discrimination against women.

Nowadays, women in South Korea are guaranteed all the legal rights that men have. In 1948, women gained their legal rights to vote, drive, and own and inherit properties and assets. All Korean citizens are guaranteed for national health insurance under the National Health Insurance Act. South Korea has worked on its way to implement gender equality by revising and changing any discriminative contents in its existing legislative laws since the 1980s.

Implementation of laws to prohibit gender inequalities and prejudice have increased the number of women in the workforce. Nevertheless, women's status in South Korea illustrates the fact that Korea still has a lot of room to be improved for gender equality. Therefore, the legislation and public rules have critical and significant roles to influence Korean cities to elevate the social structure substantially.

South Korea outlawed marital rape in 2013.

"The Framework Act on Women's Development," which was enacted in 1995 and has been used as a legal basis for Korean women's policy, was renamed "The Framework Act on Gender Equality." From the birth of the Framework Act on Gender Equality in May 2014 to the enforcement on July 1, 2015, the various discourse was produced to view the revision as a paradigm shift in Korean women's policy. However, the revision has shaken the understanding of terms such as “gender” and “women,” “gender equality” or “gender-sensitive perspectives,” and caused a gap between political and academic over terminology. In this situation, we must consider how Korean women's policies have so far understood gender and how policies have changed. In addition, research has been conducted to explore ways in which "The Framework Act on Gender Equality" can be changed for the better through the concept of intersectionality.

By conducting surveys and in-depth interviews with Korean female welfare workers, investigators focused on examining gender awareness through various questions about gender perspectives and analyzing women's gender roles and gender identities in their families. According to the analysis, gender awareness was very weak in Korean women's welfare policy, but awareness of its importance and necessity was high. Women's welfare officials are often aware of women's gender roles as "dependents" and "caregivers," which results in a reflection in the policy's implementation process.

Reproductive Rights 
As this commentary examines a number of pronatalist policies implemented in South Korea within the last decade, the aim of the commentary is to assess how such policies could harm women's reproductive health if they are implemented only with the intention of controlling population growth. Since 2005, South Korea has heavily regulated and promoted the use of reproductive technologies, including abortion technologies and assisted reproductive technologies (ARTs), to increase population growth. South Korea has one of the lowest fertility rates in the world. During the period 1990-1994 to 2015-2019, the number of unintended pregnancies in South Korea decreased by 49%. Abortion rates declined by 46% during the same period. During 2005-2009, the share of unintended pregnancies that ended in abortion reached 67%, then decreased to 62%. 

South Korea’s criminal code has been amended to remove abortion care from its provisions effective January 1st, 2021. This will eliminate legal barriers to accessing the required abortion care. Abortion in South Korea was illegal in most circumstances from 1953 to 2020. A pregnant woman who undergoes an abortion can be sentenced for a year in prison or fined as much as 2 million won.  Two years of prison could be handed down to healthcare workers who perform abortions. Except in cases of rape or incest, pregnancies that may jeopardize the health of the woman, or if the woman or her spouse are suffering from certain hereditary or communicable diseases, the ban does not apply. However, abortions are often performed despite this, and the law is rarely enforced.  As a result, Patients and healthcare providers were prevented from discussing their experiences, sharing information, and getting support from each other. It was ruled unconstitutional by the Constitutional court on April 11, 2019, and a law revision must be carried out by the end of 2020. After being proposed for revision in October 2020, the law was not voted upon by the deadline of December 31st, 2020.

Education 

In traditional Korean society, women and girls were not given access to formal education and the literacy rate was low. The transition came in the late 19th century to the early 20th century when the Western Christian missionaries came to South Korea by establishing modern schools for girls. In 1886, Methodist missionaries found a primary school. In 1945, this primary school gained its status as a university, which is now called Ewha Womans University. Ewha Womans University is still known as the most prestigious women's university in South Korea. There were numerous women's schools established respectively.  In the 1890s, Chongsin Girls' School and Paehwa Girls' School were established in Seoul, which is the capital city of Korea. There were about ten women institutions of higher education such as junior colleges, colleges, and university by 1987 in South Korea. In fact, the women enrolment for higher education was at 28%. In 1987, there were about 262,500 female students in higher education. Although more women had access to higher education compared to the past, only 16% of university and college educators were women in 1987.

The growing number of women receiving a college education has meant that their role both in and out of the household differs from that of their mothers and grandmothers. Many college-educated women plan independent careers and challenge the right of parents to choose a spouse. The often fierce battles between university students and police during the late 1980s included female participants. A correspondent for the Far Eastern Economic Review quoted a male student leader as saying that "short girls make great demonstrators, as they're very tough and very hard to catch."  The number of employed married women, however, increased by approximately 12.6 percent annually in the years since 1977.

In 1983 more women—51.8%—were employed in rural areas than in urban areas—37.9 percent. Most of the women working in rural areas were over the age of thirty, as young females (and males) tended to move to, and seek employment in, cities and industrial areas.

Official South Korean statistics indicated that 43.6% of women were in the workforce by 1988. Prospects for lower-class women, however, were frequently grim. In some cases, they were obliged to become part of the "entertainment industry" in order to survive economically. According to one estimate, brothels, bars, massage parlors, discos, and what are known as "Taiwan style" barbershops (that is, those often employing a greater number of masseuses than barbers) employed as many as 1 million women, though not all were prostitutes. This underworld of abuse and exploitation had begun to be criticized and exposed by women's activists.

In today's South Korean society, the Constitution ensures equal access to education for women and also eliminates any discrimination regarding receiving education based on gender. In 1970, the literacy rate was 87.6%. In addition, according to 2002 estimates, the literacy rate increased to 97.9%; 96.6% of women and 99.2% of men are literate. According to 2008 estimates, there is approximately a 99% enrolment rate for both elementary school and middle school. The enrolment rate for high school is at approximately 96.6%. This means that almost 99% of the current South Korean women have access to primary and secondary education.

Family life 
The duty of a woman to her husband, or rather to her husband's family, was seen as absolute and unquestionable. Neo-Confucian orthodoxy dictated that the woman, separated from her parents, had a primary duty of providing a male heir for her husband's family. According to this custom, once married, a woman had to leave her parents' household and then become a part of her husband's household. The relationship between wife and husband was often, if not usually, distant, aptly described by the Korean proverb: "By day, like seeing a stranger; by night, like seeing a lover." Joseon Dynasty law prohibited widows from remarrying, though the same prohibition did not apply to widowers. Furthermore, the sons and grandsons of widows who defied the ban, like children of secondary wives, were not allowed to take the civil service examinations and become scholar-officials. In traditional society, only men could obtain a divorce. A husband could divorce his wife if she were barren—barrenness being defined simply as the inability to bear sons. The incompatibility of a wife and her in-laws was also considered grounds for divorce. In contemporary society, both men and women have the right to obtain a divorce. Social and economic discrimination, however, make the lot of divorced women more difficult. The husband may still demand custody of the children, although a revision of the Family Law in 1977 made it more difficult for him to coerce or to deceive his wife into agreeing to an unfair settlement. The rate of divorce in South Korea is increasing rapidly. In 1975 the number of divorces was 17,000. In the mid-1980s, the annual number of divorces was between 23,000 and 26,000, and in 1987 there were 45,000 divorces.

Despite the rapid changes in society due to industrialization, a gender-equal family culture has not emerged due to the long-standing influence of the patriarchal family norms. In particular, familism, which has been emphasized through the industrialization process, has continued to be family-centered and patriarchal, emphasizing the safety of the entire family rather than the individual. Familism consequently infringes on women's unique rights by defining women as secondary to their family composition. In South Korea's history, which has disparaged women's rights, gender inequality has been strengthened, reproduced through the family's life culture. For example, the traditional marriage and kinship system, which used women as objects of paternalism, has excluded women from ancestor worship, inheritance, and possession. However, the recent debate over the abolition of the family headship system in South Korea has emerged as an important social issue.

The tradition of total female submission persisted in Korean villages until relatively recent times. One Korean scholar who came from the conservative Chungcheong region recalled that when a high school friend died of sickness during the 1940s, his young bride committed suicide. Her act was commemorated in her own and the surrounding communities as an outstanding example of devotion to duty.

Traditionally, men and women were strictly segregated, both inside and outside the house. Aristocratic women spent most of their lives in seclusion in the women's chamber. It is said that the traditional pastime of nolttwigi, a game of jumping up and down on a seesaw-like contraption, originated among bored women who wanted to peek over the high walls of their family compounds to see what the outside world was like. Economic necessity gave women of the lower classes some freedom as they participated in farm work and sometimes earned supplemental income through making and selling things.

As of February 2015, adultery is no longer illegal in South Korea.

Professional life 

According to The Economists 2013 "Glass-ceiling index" of five indicators of friendliness towards working women, South Korea ranks the lowest of all OECD countries because of its lack of women in senior jobs. Historically, however, a small minority of women played an active role in society and even wielded political influence. These people included female shamans (mudang), who were called upon to cure illnesses, tell fortunes, or in other ways enlist the help of spirits in realizing the wishes of their clients. Despite its sponsorship of neo-Confucianism, the Choson Dynasty had an office of shamanism, and female shamans often were quite influential in the royal palace. The female physicians who treated female patients (because male physicians were forbidden to examine them) constituted another important group of women. Sometimes they acted as spies or policewomen because they could get into the female quarters of a house. Still another group of women were the kisaeng. Some kisaeng, or entertainers, were merely prostitutes; but others, were talented musicians, dancers, painters, and poets who interacted with their male patrons. The kisaeng tradition perpetuated one of the more dubious legacies of the Joseon past: an extreme double standard concerning the sexual behavior of married men and women that still persists. In the cities, however, many middle-class women have begun to break with these traditions.

An interesting regional variation on traditional female roles continued in the late 1980s. In the coastal villages of Jeju Island, women divers swam in search of seaweed, oysters, and other marine products and were economically self-sufficient. Often they provided the main economic support for the family while the husband did subsidiary work — took care of the children and did household chores — in sharp contrast to the Confucian norm. The number of women divers was dwindling, however, and men were increasingly performing jobs in service industries. Ancestor worship was rarely practiced while female-centered shamanistic rites were widespread.

The factories of South Korea employ hundreds of thousands of young women on shop floors and assembly lines making, among other things, textiles and clothes, shoes, and electronic components. South Korea's economic success was bought in large measure with the sweat of these generally overworked and poorly paid female laborers. In the offices of banks and other service enterprises, young women working as clerks and secretaries are indispensable. Unlike their sisters on Jeju Island, however, the majority of these women work only until marriage.

There has been a tangible increase in the number of women joining the workforce. In 2014, the number of Korean women in the workforce was estimated to be 57%, whereas in 1995 the number 47.6%. The statistical increase in the number of employed women has not correlated with the equality of wage, as the gender wage gap reported in 2013 was 36.3%, the worst of all OECD nations present in the data.

A study was conducted to justify the Work-Family Conflict scale (WFC) revised and developed by Ginamon and Rich for married working women in Korea. The work-family conflict measure considered both directions, "work to a family," and "family to a work," to better understand the various roles of women in the work-family domain. Through this test, a discriminatory feasibility test between work-family conflict and work-family fostering revealed a significant negative correlation. This result supported the validity of the WFC. Simultaneous inspection of WFC and workplace satisfaction confirmed validity, and as the work-family conflict grows, women's work satisfaction decreases. And it has created the prejudice that the workplace of female workers is where they stay "temporarily."

Although increasing numbers of women work outside the home, the dominant conception, particularly for the college-educated middle class, is that the husband is the "outside person," the one whose employment provides the main source of economic support; the wife is the "inside person," whose chief responsibility is maintenance of the household. While it is viewed as a societal norm that women be able to contribute to the finance of the household, the majority of the onus is placed upon men, Women tend to leave the labor force when they get married. Many women manage the family finances, and a large number join kye, informal private short-term credit associations that give them access to funds that might not be obtainable from a conventional bank. Probably the most important responsibility of married women is the management of their children's education.

Women also claim much of the responsibilities of being a caretaker, as half of the women that voluntarily leave their mid-career or senior-level jobs do so due to family commitments College-educated women in Korea tend to invest more time and capital to raising their children than individuals without a degree. but due to the declining population in Korea There has been a conscious effort to address these issues by the South Korean government, as "the government gives loans or subsidies to businesses to build childcare facilities, and more than half of all businesses now provide these. It also pays subsidies to businesses that offer more than 30 days of childcare leave a year, allow women to work less than full time, and re-employ women returning from maternity leave."

Despite these efforts, the number of women who regularly use these support systems composes a minority of the women who find themselves in this position. A major factor that influences these decisions is the declining birth rate in Korea, as Korea's birthrate of 1.19 per family put a greater emphasis upon the quality of education and care upon the one, or two children that the family will take care of.

According to a comprehensive analysis of factors that can affect female workers' gender discrimination by dividing them into personal, family, relational, and environmental characteristics, "the perception of bosses and leaders" and "relationship with them" were important factors that determine women's perception of gender discrimination at work.

Korea's gender system serves as the basis for the social rights of non-regular female workers in structural relationships with the labor market and welfare state. Women's irregular labor in Korea is the main form of "temporary" employment and is characterized by job insecurity, low wages, long-term labor, and exclusion from national welfare and corporate welfare. From a social perspective, all types of rights based on their status as workers, parents, spouses, and citizens are vulnerable: paid labor, unpaid labor, unpaid labor, and care rights. Until now, it has been interpreted that female non-regular workers are treated worse than male non-regular workers due to the influence of the gender system, which defines women as care-giver and secondary workers. However, the “male livelihood support” function, which provides married women with the opposite of unpaid labor, only works for middle-class married women in Korea, and in this sense, Korea's gender system is more of a "layered" male livelihood support rather than a "typical" male livelihood support. And the poor social rights of female irregular workers are responsible for all three closely linked structures: a social insurance-driven welfare state, a dual labour market system, and a gender system in the male-dependent model. But the most important of these is the “dual labour market system.” Without solving the problem of the dual labour market system, it is unlikely that the social rights of non-regular female workers will be improved.

The glass ceiling for women has been tested in contemporary times. In 2012, Samsung promoted three women into executive roles, which was unusual for a company of its size. Samsung has also stated that it aims to have at least 10% of its executive positions to be held by women.

In 2013 Kwon Seon-joo became South Korea's first female bank CEO, as the CEO of state-owned Industrial Bank of Korea.

In 2021, South Korea's actress Youn Yuh-Jung becomes the first Korean actress nominated for Oscar. The nominated movie "Minari" is about the settlement of Korean families who immigrated to the United States. In this movie, she played the role of Monica's grandmother, Soon-Ja. She won the Oscar for best-supporting actress for her performance in "Minari" and made history by becoming the first Korean actor to win an Academy Award.

Women's movement 
The Korean women's movement started in the 1890s with the foundation of Chanyang-hoe, followed by a number of other groups, primarily focused on women's education and the abolition of gender segregation and other didscriminatory practices.

When Korea became a Japanese colony in 1910 women's associations were banned by the Japanese and many women instead engaged in the underground  resistance groups such as the Yosong Aeguk Tongji-hoe (Patriotic Women's Society) and the Taehan Aeguk Buin-hoe (Korean Patriotic Women's Society).  As a result, the role of women in society began to change.

After end of the War and the partition of Korea in 1945, the Korean women's movement was split. In North Korea all women's movement was channelled in to the Korean Democratic Women's Union; in South Korea, the women's movement where united under the Korean National Council of Women in 1959, which in 1973 organized the women's group in the Pan-Women's Society for the Revision of the Family Law to revise the discriminating Family Law of 1957, a cause that remained a main focus for the rest of the 20th-century and did not result in any major reform until 1991.

#MeToo 
There is a relatively new concept of feminism in South Korea, but the Me Too movement has taken root there as well, with some high-profile politicians and entertainment figures being ousted after sexual assault survivors came forward. As of late January 2018, the Me Too movement has not taken off in South Korea due to a lack of media coverage. In the intervening period, the movement has drawn the attention of dozens of powerful public figures. While South Korea has embraced modern economic and technological advancements while keeping strong patriarchal traditions, the rise of the Me Too movement is a significant change. More than 30% of the president's cabinet members are women, the highest number in the history of South Korea. It has also been announced that the government will be tougher on employees who commit sexual misconduct in the workplace through the implementation of new measures. The Me Too movement has had a greater impact on South Korea, where feminist movements were already well established; laws and policies have been affected because of this movement. As a means for organizing offline protests and requesting policy changes, social media platforms were used.

Women in the military 
Conscription in South Korea has existed since 1957. Male citizens between the ages of 18 and 28 are currently required to perform compulsory military service. Women became a part of the South Korean military in 1950. Women are not currently required to perform military service, but they are allowed to join the military voluntarily. As of 2002, about 2,100 female soldiers were enlisted in the South Korean army. This represented less than 1% of the entire body of soldiers. As of 2010, about 3.5% of South Korean soldiers were female. In 2020, there were approximately 7,550 women enlisted in the military, making up about 8.8% of South Korean soldiers. The first group of women to serve in the South Korean army enlisted in 1950 in response to the outbreak of the Korean War. A volunteer army of about 500 women was formed to assist the all male combat units. The women received basic military training, but were only given tasks related to propaganda and communications. The volunteer army was disbanded in 1951, and the women were discharged. In 1955 the Women's Military Training Center was created with the sole purpose of training female soldiers. Women were recruited to perform work in telecommunications, stenography and typing. The amount of women in the South Korean military was limited at this time, and women that enlisted were not given the same responsibilities as men. It was a common belief that female soldiers could not perform as well as their male counterparts in combat, and many female officers have struggled with the physical intensity of basic training.
In the 1980s, gender issues became a part of state's policy because of the transition of power from military rule to civilian rule. At this time, women's organizations began to seek equality by demanding more representation in South Korea's public employment and military. While representation increased in response, equality was not immediately achieved. Before 1988, female soldiers had to resign if they became pregnant, as pregnant women were considered unfit for duty. Because of the Equal Employment Law of 1988, pregnancy is now permitted for all commissioned officers, and non-commissioned officers with a rank of sergeant first class or higher.
Since 1990, the responsibilities of female soldiers have changed, as the range of tasks given to women in the South Korean military have been expanded. Female military recruits now receive the same basic training as the male recruits. Female soldiers have often been segregated from their male counterparts, however, through discrimination in their promotions and appointments. It wasn't until January 2002 that the first female officer was promoted to a one star general.
In June 2021, a South Korean two-star army general was arrested for sexually harassing a female subordinate, one month after South Korea's Air Force chief resigned over the suicide of a master sergeant who was sexually assaulted by a fellow sergeant. Due to criticism over the handling of the case, government officials asked for all complaints of sexual abuse to be recorded and have reportedly launched 20 separate investigations to follow up complaints.

Prostitution 

Prostitution in South Korea is illegal, but according to one estimate, brothels, bars, massage parlors, discos, and what are known as "Taiwan style" barbershops (that is, those often employing a greater number of masseuses than barbers) employed as many as 1 million women, though not all were prostitutes. This underworld of abuse and exploitation has begun to be criticized and exposed by women's activists.
South Korean women and girls have been victims of sex trafficking in South Korea. They are raped and physically and psychologically harmed in brothels, businesses, homes, hotels, and other locations throughout the country.

In 2003, after recovering from a financial meltdown, the unemployment rate for women was 12% in the 15-29 age group. In 2006, women in the age group of 20-29 constituted 40% of the total unemployed population, the figure being roughly around 340,000. The high levels of unemployment for women has contributed to the growth of the Korean sex trade. There are an estimated 500,000-1,000,000 women who partake in the sex trade, that being approximately one in every twenty-five women. The prominence of the sex trade has given birth to the "Bacchus Ladies", grandmothers who trade sex and other favours on top of the energy drink Bacchus they sell, of which their name was coined after.

South Korean law first acknowledged women as rapists in June 2013; in 2015, the first woman was charged with rape in South Korea. The woman, only identified with her surname Jeon, was also the first woman to be arrested for sexually abusing a man.

Crimes against women 

Spy cameras, known as molka (ko: 몰카) in South Korea, are an ongoing issue, in particular their use in illicitly recording women and girls. As technology has progressed, cameras have become smaller and some have been made to resemble everyday objects (for example: ballpoint pens, key rings, USB sticks). These small "spy cams" have been placed in public restrooms, motels, hairdryers and TVs. More than 6,000 spy camera cases were reported to the police every year between 2013 and 2017.

Criminals often use these videos or pictures, publishing them online for money. In some cases they have been published to online live streams. While many of those who make the recordings are indiscriminate with regard to their victims, some specifically target those with fame or wealth such as K-pop stars, actors, government officials, or popular social media figures.

Spycam recording is an invasion of privacy involving a disregard for human rights, and it can have a significant impact on its victims. Some people are frightened by the thought that someone could always be watching them. Other reactions include stress, drinking, and in some cases the victims have committed suicide. Before the National Assembly extended the law on this, offenders would serve up to 18 months for the crime. The maximum sentence has been extended to 3 years, and this includes anyone who has the footage in their possession rather than just the person who made the recording. In June 2018, President Moon Jae-In further extended the penalty to 10 million won (U.S. $9,000) or five years in prison. Over 6,400 cases of illegal filming were reported in 2017, while in 2012 the number was 2,400. There were over 26,000 reported cases from 2012 to 2016. With few government staff available to inspect public restrooms and items, it has been difficult for government agencies to find hidden cameras since they are usually only placed in a location for a short time.

Behaviours such as stereotyping, discrimination, demeaning or contemptuous speech, regarding women as sex objects, focusing on appearance and age, and replacing women with body parts or genitals, have become commonplace in South Korean online culture. These can be disregarded as the acts of malicious people, but the production and distribution of online hate speech can nevertheless reinforce stereotypes and lead to generalization. Online hate speech is reproduced and multiplied in ways that can establish and reinforce prejudice against women. The pursuit of gender equality in online spaces may require education.

In 2021, a digital sex crime called the Nth room case occurred in South Korea. The suspects used messenger apps such as Telegram to lure and threaten victims, filming and distributing the resultant sexual exploitation. Research has been actively pursued in South Korea into ways to respond to digital sex crimes such as the Nth room case. The research has identified a lack of punishment for many digital sex crimes, emphasizing that digital sex crime should be regarded as a form of violence and a crime against women. Increasing the punishment for making illegal recordings and actively investigating reports have been suggested. In addition, technology could be used to block the publication of illegal recordings. There is also an opinion that watching illegal recordings could be punished.

On June 16, 2021, Human Rights Watch, an international NGO, released a report detailing digital sex crime in South Korea. The report claims that digital sex crimes in South Korea are pervasive and often dismissed by police and lawmakers because the crimes don't take place physically. Prosecution of digital sexual crime cases decreased by over 43 percent in 2019, and 79 percent of those convicted in 2020 received only a suspended sentence and/or a fine.

Prospect 

The hate expression for Korean women in the 2000s has been moving toward racialization, as can be seen in the expression "Kimchi girl." In this situation, the "Megalian" phenomenon occurred in which female parties in their 20s and 30s actively carry out hate speech. These women claim to employ a mirroring strategy by parodying the misogyny of men. In other words, the existing patriarchal gender discourse is materialized in reverse on a narrative level, emphasizing its sexual discrimination and contradiction. Korean women in their 20s and 30s were called "Candle Light Girl" in 2008. These were symbols of empathy for others and solidarity with minorities. “Megalian” results from the prevailing hatred against women in Korean society, the absence of a discourse on racism, and the focus on the encouragement of patriarchal family and child-care in women's policy. In 2021, the Megalian site has been closed, but mirroring practices initiated by Megalian are still being called by radical feminists in Korea. Before unnecessary conflicts and extreme gender-based compatibility intensify, the Candle Light Girl aspiration for democracy, which was extremely radical in its early stage of development, can be developed into another form.

Over the past 20 years, Korean society has achieved a lot in terms of social interest in women or institutional achievement, and women's research has also achieved quantitative growth, with expanding academic fields and diversifying research topics. However, it is hard to say that such quantitative growth of research extends the influence of feminism. Rather, the feminism of backlash or callousness and hatred is spreading in the last decades. The women's movement has achieved a lot since the 1990s in pursuit of participatory politics such as "sexualization" and "governance," but faces a crisis caused by the loss of identity of the women's movement and the disappearance of progressive frames. Recently, the expansion of neo-liberalism has deepened the problem of irregular workers in the female labor force and job insecurity. In addition, the increase in work-family conflicts has led to widespread instability in women's labor and personal lives. In particular, women in their 20s and 30s are immersed in individualism and consumer capitalism amid social anxiety. So they are moving away from the identity of feminism. Meanwhile, the Korean family system is in danger because of the conflict between individualism and the preservation of traditional patriarchy. Nevertheless, most women's studies remain in studies that merely suggest phenomenological analysis or fragmentary policies, and do not find answers to essential signs of crisis. The decrease in critical women's research is also linked to the crisis of feminism. To revitalize feminism, which has been fading since the 2000s, it is time to seek more critical and practical awareness of women's reality.

References

Further reading
 Cho, Hyukjin. "Humble white apron, shameful blue uniform and empowering red union vest: Women janitors in South Korea." Asian Journal of Women's Studies 25.4 (2019): 555–571.
 Chong, Kelly H. Deliverance and submission: Evangelical women and the negotiation of patriarchy in South Korea (Brill, 2020).
 Hasunuma, Linda, and Ki-young Shin. "# MeToo in Japan and South Korea:# WeToo,# WithYou." Journal of Women, Politics & Policy 40.1 (2019): 97–111.
 Jones, Nicola. Gender and the political opportunities of democratization in South Korea (Springer, 2016).
 Lee, Young-Im. "South Korea: women’s political representation." in The Palgrave Handbook of Women’s Political Rights (Palgrave Macmillan, London, 2019) pp. 627–640.
 Lee, Young-Im, and Farida Jalalzai. "President Park Geun-Hye of South Korea: A Woman President without Women?." Politics & Gender 13.4 (2017): 597–617.
 Podoler, Guy. "South Korea: Women and sport in a persistent patriarchy." in The Routledge Handbook of Sport in Asia (Routledge, 2020) pp. 324–335.
 Soh, C. Sarah. The comfort women: Sexual violence and postcolonial memory in Korea and Japan (U of Chicago Press, 2020).
 Suh, Doowon. "Institutionalizing social movements: the dual strategy of the Korean women's movement." Sociological Quarterly 52.3 (2011): 442–471. online

External links

 Jeoong, S., & Griffiths, J. (March 21, 2019). Hundreds of South Korean motel guests were secretly filmed and live streamed online. Retrieved December 8, 2020.
 Goo Hara and the trauma of South Korea's spy cam victims. (November 28, 2019). Retrieved December 9, 2020.
 Gibson, J. (August 14, 2020). Will South Korea Finally Have Its Reckoning on Sex Crimes? Retrieved December 10, 2020.
 Maresca, T. (February 7, 2020). Two years into #MeToo in South Korea, change is slow to come. Retrieved December 10, 2020.